General Sir William Henry Seymour  (1829 – 20 June 1921) was a senior British Army officer.

Military career
Seymour was commissioned in 1847. He saw action in the Crimean War in 1854 and in the Indian Rebellion of 1857 and then served as Inspector-General of Cavalry in Ireland from 1874 to 1879. He was Colonel of the 3rd Dragoon Guards from 1883 to 1891, colonel of the 13th Hussars from 1891 to 1894 and colonel of the 2nd Dragoon Guards (Queen's Bays) from 1894 until his death on 20 June 1921.

References

 

|-
 

|-
 

British Army generals
1829 births
1921 deaths
Knights Commander of the Order of the Bath